The 2009–10 SIJHL season is the 9th season of the Superior International Junior Hockey League (SIJHL). The six teams of the SIJHL will play 52-game schedules, except for Wisconsin who will play a 20-game schedule.

Come February, the top teams of the league will play down for the Bill Salonen Cup, the SIJHL championship.  The winner of the Bill Salonen Cup will compete in the Central Canadian Junior "A" championship, the Dudley Hewitt Cup.  If successful against the winners of the Ontario Junior Hockey League and Northern Ontario Junior Hockey League, the champion would then move on to play in the Canadian Junior Hockey League championship, the 2010 Royal Bank Cup.

Changes 
Thunder Bay Bearcats leave league.
Schreiber Diesels leave league.
Fort Frances Jr. Sabres become Fort Frances Lakers.
Thunder Bay Wolverines join league from Thunder Bay Junior B Hockey League.
Wisconsin Mustangs join league for part-time schedule.

Final standings
Note: GP = Games played; W = Wins; L = Losses; OTL = Overtime losses; SL = Shootout losses; GF = Goals for; GA = Goals against; PTS = Points; x = clinched playoff berth; y = clinched division title; z = clinched conference title

Teams listed on the official league website.

Standings listed on official league website.

2009-10 Bill Salonen Cup Playoffs

Preliminary round robin
Home-and-home format between SIJHL's three top teams.  No teams are eliminated, winner gets pick of opponent in semi-final.

Playoff results are listed on the official league website.

Dudley Hewitt Cup Championship
Hosted by the Soo Thunderbirds in Sault Ste. Marie, Ontario.  Fort William finished in second place.

Round Robin
Fort William North Stars 3 - Soo Thunderbirds (NOJHL) 2 OT
Abitibi Eskimos (NOJHL) 4 - Fort William North Stars 3 OT
Oakville Blades (OJAHL) 2 - Fort William North Stars 1 OT

Semi-final
Fort William North Stars 3 - Soo Thunderbirds (NOJHL) 0

Final
Oakville Blades (OJAHL) 2 - Fort William North Stars 1

Scoring leaders 
Note: GP = Games played; G = Goals; A = Assists; Pts = Points; PIM = Penalty minutes

Leading goaltenders 
Note: GP = Games played; Mins = Minutes played; W = Wins; L = Losses: OTL = Overtime losses; SL = Shootout losses; GA = Goals Allowed; SO = Shutouts; GAA = Goals against average

Awards
Most Valuable Player - Trevor Gamache (Fort William North Stars)
Most Improved Player - Matt Hunter (Thunder Bay Wolverines)
Rookie of the Year - Jameson Shortreed (Fort Frances Lakers)
Top Defenceman - Jon Mitchell (Dryden Ice Dogs)
Top Defensive Forward - Ryan Magill (Fort William North Stars)
Most Gentlemanly Player - Mike Lennon (Dryden Ice Dogs)
Top Goaltender - Jameson Shortreed (Fort Frances Lakers)
Coach of the Year - Clint Mylymok (Dryden Ice Dogs)
Top Scorer Award - Trevor Gamache (Fort William North Stars)
Top Executive - Ted Lake (Dryden Ice Dogs)

See also 
 2010 Royal Bank Cup
 Dudley Hewitt Cup

References

External links 
 Official website of the Superior International Junior Hockey League
 Official website of the Canadian Junior Hockey League

Superior International Junior Hockey League seasons
SIJHL